Cities and towns under the oblast's jurisdiction:
Kostroma (Кострома) (administrative center)
Buy (Буй)
Galich (Галич)
Manturovo (Мантурово)
Nerekhta (Нерехта)
Neya (Нея)
Sharya (Шарья)
Urban-type settlements under the town's jurisdiction:
Vetluzhsky (Ветлужский)
Volgorechensk (Волгореченск)
Districts:
Antropovsky (Антроповский)
with 5 settlements under the district's jurisdiction.
Buysky (Буйский)
Urban-type settlements under the district's jurisdiction:
Chistye Bory (Чистые Боры)
with 2 settlements under the district's jurisdiction.
Chukhlomsky (Чухломский)
Towns under the district's jurisdiction:
Chukhloma (Чухлома)
with 7 settlements under the district's jurisdiction.
Galichsky (Галичский)
with 5 settlements under the district's jurisdiction.
Kadyysky (Кадыйский)
Urban-type settlements under the district's jurisdiction:
Kadyy (Кадый)
with 7 settlements under the district's jurisdiction.
Kologrivsky (Кологривский)
Towns under the district's jurisdiction:
Kologriv (Кологрив)
with 4 settlements under the district's jurisdiction.
Kostromskoy (Костромской)
with 13 settlements under the district's jurisdiction.
Krasnoselsky (Красносельский)
Urban-type settlements under the district's jurisdiction:
Krasnoye-na-Volge (Красное-на-Волге)
with 8 settlements under the district's jurisdiction.
Makaryevsky (Макарьевский)
Towns under the district's jurisdiction:
Makaryev (Макарьев)
with 7 settlements under the district's jurisdiction.
Manturovsky (Мантуровский)
with 5 settlements under the district's jurisdiction.
Mezhevskoy (Межевской)
with 4 settlements under the district's jurisdiction.
Nerekhtsky (Нерехтский)
with 4 settlements under the district's jurisdiction.
Neysky (Нейский)
with 8 settlements under the district's jurisdiction.
Oktyabrsky (Октябрьский)
with 5 settlements under the district's jurisdiction.
Ostrovsky (Островский)
with 6 settlements under the district's jurisdiction.
Parfenyevsky (Парфеньевский)
with 4 settlements under the district's jurisdiction.
Pavinsky (Павинский)
with 4 settlements under the district's jurisdiction.
Ponazyrevsky (Поназыревский)
Urban-type settlements under the district's jurisdiction:
Ponazyrevo (Поназырево)
with 3 settlements under the district's jurisdiction.
Pyshchugsky (Пыщугский)
with 4 settlements under the district's jurisdiction.
Sharyinsky (Шарьинский)
with 10 settlements under the district's jurisdiction.
Soligalichsky (Солигаличский)
Towns under the district's jurisdiction:
Soligalich (Солигалич)
with 7 settlements under the district's jurisdiction.
Sudislavsky (Судиславский)
Urban-type settlements under the district's jurisdiction:
Sudislavl (Судиславль)
with 3 settlements under the district's jurisdiction.
Susaninsky (Сусанинский)
Urban-type settlements under the district's jurisdiction:
Susanino (Сусанино)
with 6 settlements under the district's jurisdiction.
Vokhomsky (Вохомский)
with 6 settlements under the district's jurisdiction.

References

Kostroma Oblast
Kostroma Oblast